Beiyunhedong station is a station on Line 6 of the Beijing Subway. It was opened on December 30, 2018.

Station Layout 
The station has an underground island platform.

Exits 
There are 3 exits, lettered B, C, and D. Exit B is accessible.

Future Development
It is located near the under construction Beijing Sub-Center railway station.

References

Beijing Subway stations in Tongzhou District
Railway stations in China opened in 2018